The 1997 Southern Conference baseball tournament was held at Joseph P. Riley Jr. Park in Charleston, South Carolina, from April 30 through May 3. Top seeded  won the tournament and earned the Southern Conference's automatic bid to the 1997 NCAA Division I baseball tournament. It was the Catamounts eighth tournament win. This was the first tournament to be held at Riley Park, which opened as the home venue of The Citadel for the 1997 season.

The tournament used a double-elimination format. Only the top eight teams participated, so Marshall was not in the field. This was Marshall's last season in the conference, as they joined the Mid-American Conference prior to the 1997–98 season.

Seeding

Bracket 

* - Indicates extra innings.

All-Tournament Team

References 

Tournament
Southern Conference Baseball Tournament
Southern Conference baseball tournament
Southern Conference baseball tournament
Southern Conference baseball tournament